Milton Keynes is a city and the largest settlement in Buckinghamshire, England, about  north-west of London. The River Great Ouse forms its northern boundary; a tributary, the River Ouzel, meanders through its linear parks and balancing lakes. Approximately 25% of the urban area is parkland or woodland and includes two Sites of Special Scientific Interest (SSSIs).

In the 1960s, the UK government decided that a further generation of new towns in the South East of England was needed to relieve housing congestion in London. At designation, its area incorporated the existing towns of Bletchley,  Fenny Stratford, Wolverton and Stony Stratford, along with another fifteen villages and farmland in between. These settlements had an extensive historical record since the Norman conquest; detailed archaeological investigations prior to development revealed evidence of human occupation from the Neolithic period to modern times, including in particular the Milton Keynes Hoard of Bronze Age gold jewellery. The government established a development corporation (MKDC) to design and deliver this new city. The corporation decided on a softer, more human-scaled landscape than in the earlier English new towns but with an emphatically modernist architecture. An extensive network of shared paths for leisure cyclists and pedestrians criss-crosses through and between them. Again rejecting the residential tower blocks that had been so recently fashionable but unloved, they set a height limit of three storeys outside the planned centre.

Facilities include a 1,400-seat theatre, a municipal art gallery, two multiplex cinemas, an ecumenical central church, a 400-seat concert hall, a teaching hospital, a 30,500-seat football stadium, an indoor ski-slope and a 65,000-capacity open-air concert venue. Seven railway stations serve the Milton Keynes urban area (one inter-city). The Open University is based here and there is a small campus of the University of Bedfordshire. Most major sports are represented at amateur level; Red Bull Racing (Formula One), MK Dons (association football), and Milton Keynes Lightning (ice hockey) are its professional teams. The Peace Pagoda overlooking Willen Lake was the first such to be built in Europe. The many works of sculpture in parks and public spaces include the iconic Concrete Cows at Milton Keynes Museum.

Milton Keynes is among the most economically productive localities in the UK, ranking highly against a number of criteria. It has the UK's fifth-highest number of business startups per capita (but equally of business failures). It is home to several major national and international companies. Despite economic success and personal wealth for some, there are pockets of nationally significant poverty. The employment profile is composed of about 90% service industries and 9% manufacturing.

On 15 August 2022, the Crown Office announced that the Queen had ordained by letters patent that the (then) Borough of Milton Keynes should have city status.

History

Birth of a 'new city'

In the 1960s, the UK government decided that a further generation of new towns in the South East of England was needed to relieve housing congestion in London. Since the 1950s, overspill housing for several London boroughs had been constructed in Bletchley. Further studies in the 1960s identified north Buckinghamshire as a possible site for a large new town, a new city, encompassing the existing towns of Bletchley, Stony Stratford, and Wolverton. The name 'Milton Keynes' was taken from that of an existing village on the site.

On 23 January 1967, when the formal "new town designation order" was made, the area to be developed was largely farmland and undeveloped villages. The site was deliberately located equidistant from London, Birmingham, Leicester, Oxford, and Cambridge, with the intention that it would be self-sustaining and eventually become a major regional centre in its own right. Planning control was taken from elected local authorities and delegated to the Milton Keynes Development Corporation (MKDC). Before construction began, every area was subject to detailed archaeological investigation: doing so has exposed a rich history of human settlement since Neolithic times and has provided a unique insight into the history of a large sample of the landscape of North Buckinghamshire.

The Corporation's strongly modernist designs were regularly featured in the magazines Architectural Design and the Architects' Journal. MKDC was determined to learn from the mistakes made in the earlier new towns, and revisit the garden city ideals. They set in place the characteristic grid roads that run between districts ('grid squares'), as well as a programme of intensive planting, balancing lakes and parkland. Central Milton Keynes ("CMK") was not intended to be a traditional town centre but a central business and shopping district to supplement local centres embedded in most of the grid squares.  This non-hierarchical devolved city plan was a departure from the English new towns tradition and envisaged a wide range of industry and diversity of housing styles and tenures. The largest and almost the last of the British New Towns, Milton Keynes has 'stood the test of time far better than most, and has proved flexible and adaptable'. The radical grid plan was inspired by the work of Melvin M. Webber, described by the founding architect of Milton Keynes, Derek Walker, as the 'father of the city'.  Webber thought that telecommunications meant that the old idea of a city as a concentric cluster was out of date and that cities which enabled people to travel around them readily would be the thing of the future, achieving "community without propinquity" for residents.

The government wound up MKDC in 1992, 25 years after the new town was founded, transferring control to the Commission for New Towns (CNT) and then finally to English Partnerships, with the planning function returning to local council control (since 1974 and the Local Government Act 1972, the Borough of Milton Keynes). From 2004–2011 a government quango, the Milton Keynes Partnership, had development control powers to accelerate the growth of Milton Keynes.

Formal award of city status
Along with many other towns and boroughs, Milton Keynes competed (unsuccessfully) for formal city status in the 2000, 2002 and 2012 competitions. However the Borough was successful in 2022, in the Queen's Platinum Jubilee Civic Honours competition. On 15 August 2022, the Crown Office announced formally that Queen Elizabeth II had ordained by letters patent that the Borough of Milton Keynes has been given city status.

Name

The name 'Milton Keynes' was a reuse of the name of one of the original historic villages in the designated area, now more generally known as 'Milton Keynes Village' to distinguish it from the modern settlement. After the Norman conquest, the de Cahaignes family held the manor from 1166 to the late 13th century as well as others in the country (Ashton Keynes in Wiltshire, Somerford Keynes in Gloucestershire, and Horsted Keynes in West Sussex). The village was originally known as Middeltone (11th century); then later as Middelton Kaynes or Caynes (13th century); Milton Keynes (15th century); and Milton alias Middelton Gaynes (17th century).

Prior history

The area that was to become Milton Keynes encompassed a landscape that has a rich historic legacy. The area to be developed was largely farmland and undeveloped villages, but with evidence of permanent settlement dating back to the Bronze Age. Before construction began, every area was subject to detailed archaeological investigation: this work has provided an unprecedented insight into the history of a very large sample of the landscape of south-central England. There is evidence of Stone Age, late Bronze Age/early Iron Age,  Romano-British, Anglo-Saxon, Anglo-Norman, Medieval, and late Industrial Revolution settlements such as the railway towns of Wolverton (with its railway works) and Bletchley (at the junction of the London and North Western Railway with the OxfordCambridge Varsity Line). The most notable archaeological artefact was the Milton Keynes Hoard, which the British Museum described as 'one of the biggest concentrations of Bronze Age gold known from Britain and seems to flaunt wealth.'

Bletchley Park, the site of World War II Allied code-breaking and Colossus, the world's first programmable electronic digital computer, is a major component of MK's modern history.  It is now a flourishing heritage attraction, receiving hundreds of thousands of visitors annually.

When the boundary of Milton Keynes was defined in 1967, some 40,000 people lived in three towns and fifteen villages or hamlets in the "designated area".

Urban design

The radical plan, form and scale of Milton Keynes attracted international attention. Early phases of development include work by celebrated architects, including 
Sir Richard MacCormac, 
Norman Foster, 
Henning Larsen, 
Ralph Erskine, 
John Winter, 
and Martin Richardson. 
Led by Lord Campbell of Eskan (Chairman) and Fred Roche (General Manager), the Corporation attracted talented young architects, led by the respected designer, Derek Walker. In the modernist Miesian tradition is the Shopping Building designed by Stuart Mosscrop and Christopher Woodward, a grade II listed building, which the Twentieth Century Society inter alia regards as the 'most distinguished' twentieth century retail building in Britain. 

The Development Corporation also led an ambitious public art programme.

The urban design has not been universally praised. In 1980, the then president of the Royal Town Planning Institute, Francis Tibbalds, described Central Milton Keynes as "bland, rigid, sterile, and totally boring." Michael Edwards, a member of the original consultancy team, believes that there were weaknesses in their proposal and that the Development Corporation implemented it badly.

Grid roads and grid squares

The Milton Keynes Development Corporation planned the major road layout according to street hierarchy principles, using a grid pattern of approximately  intervals, rather than on the more conventional radial pattern found in older settlements. Major distributor roads run between communities, rather than through them: these distributor roads are known locally as grid roads and the spaces between them the districts are known as grid squares. This spacing was chosen so that people would always be within six minutes' walking distance of a grid-road bus-stop. Consequently, each grid square is a semi-autonomous community, making a unique collective of 100 clearly identifiable neighbourhoods within the overall urban environment. The grid squares have a variety of development styles, ranging from conventional urban development and industrial parks to original rural and modern urban and suburban developments. Most grid squares have a local centre, intended as a retail hub, and many have community facilities as well. Each of the original villages is the heart of its own grid-square. Originally intended under the master plan to sit alongside the grid roads, these local centres were mostly in fact built embedded in the communities.

Although the 1970 master plan assumed cross-road junctions, roundabout junctions were built at intersections because this type of junction is more efficient at dealing with small to medium volumes. Some major roads are dual carriageway, the others are single carriageway. Along one side of each single carriageway grid road, there is usually a (grassed) reservation to permit dualling or additional transport infrastructure at a later date. , this has been limited to some dualling. The edges of each grid square are landscaped and densely planted some additionally have noise attenuation mounds to minimise traffic noise from the grid road impacting the adjacent grid square. Traffic movements are fast, with relatively little congestion since there are alternative routes to any particular destination other than during peak periods. The national speed limit applies on the grid roads, although lower speed limits have been introduced on some stretches to reduce accident rates.  Pedestrians rarely need to cross grid roads at grade, as underpasses and bridges were specified at frequent places along each stretch of all of the grid roads. In contrast, the later districts planned by English Partnerships have departed from this model, without a road hierarchy but with conventional junctions with traffic lights and at grade pedestrian crossings.

Redways

There is a separate network (approximately  total length) of cycle and pedestrian routes  the redways  that runs through the grid-squares and often runs alongside the grid-road network. This was designed to segregate slow moving cycle and pedestrian traffic from fast moving motor traffic. In practice, it is mainly used for leisure cycling rather than commuting, perhaps because the cycle routes are shared with pedestrians, cross the grid-roads via bridge or underpass rather than at grade, and because some take meandering scenic routes rather than straight lines. It is so called because it is generally surfaced with red tarmac. The national Sustrans national cycle network routes 6 and 51 take advantage of this system.

Height

The original design guidance declared that commercial building heights in the centre should not exceed six storeys, with a limit of three storeys for houses (elsewhere), paraphrased locally as "no building taller than the tallest tree". In contrast, the Milton Keynes Partnership, in its expansion plans for Milton Keynes, believed that Central Milton Keynes (and elsewhere) needed "landmark buildings" and subsequently lifted the height restriction for the area. As a result, high rise buildings have been built in the central business district.     
More recent local plans have protected the existing boulevard framework and set higher standards for architectural excellence.

Linear parks

The flood plains of the Great Ouse and of its tributaries (the Ouzel and some brooks) have been protected as linear parks that run right through Milton Keynes; these were identified as important landscape and flood-management assets from the outset. At  ten times larger than London's Hyde Park and a third larger than Richmond Park the landscape architects realised that the Royal Parks model would not be appropriate or affordable and drew on their National Park experience. As Bendixson and Platt (1992) write: "They divided the Ouzel Valley into 'strings, beads and settings'. The 'strings' are well-maintained routes, be they for walking, bicycling or riding; the 'beads' are sports centres, lakeside cafes and other activity areas; the 'settings' are self-managed land-uses such as woods, riding paddocks, a golf course and a farm".

The Grand Union Canal is another green route (and demonstrates the level geography of the area there is just one minor lock in its entire  meandering route through from the southern boundary near Fenny Stratford to the "Iron Trunk" aqueduct over the Ouse at Wolverton at its northern boundary). The initial park system was planned by Peter Youngman (Chief Landscape Architect),  who also developed landscape precepts for all development areas: groups of grid squares were to be planted with different selections of trees and shrubs to give them distinct identities. The detailed planning and landscape design of parks and of the grid roads was evolved under the leadership of Neil Higson, who from 1977 took over from Youngman. Campbell Park is described by Nikolaus Pevsner as "... the largest and most imaginative park to have been laid out in Britain in the 20th century". The park is listed (grade 2) by Historic England,

In a national comparison of urban areas by open space available to residents, Milton Keynes ranked highest in the UK.

Forest city concept
The Development Corporation's original design concept aimed for a "forest city" and its foresters planted millions of trees from its own nursery in Newlands in the following years. When the Development Corporation was being wound up, it transferred the major parks, lakes, river-banks and grid-road margins to the Parks Trust, a charity which is independent of the municipal authority. MKDC endowed the Parks Trust with a portfolio of commercial properties, the income from which pays for the upkeep of the green spaces. , approximately 25% of the urban area is parkland or woodland. It includes two  Sites of Special Scientific Interest, Howe Park Wood and Oxley Mead.

Centre

As a key element of the planners' vision, Milton Keynes has a purpose built centre, with a very large "covered high street" shopping centre,  
a theatre,  
municipal art gallery,
a multiplex cinema, 
hotels, 
central business district, 
an ecumenical church, 
City Council offices and central railway station.

Original towns and villages

Milton Keynes consists of many pre-existing towns and villages that anchored the urban design, as well as new infill developments. The modern-day urban area outside the original six main towns (Bletchley, Fenny Stratford, Newport Pagnell, Stony Stratford, Wolverton, and Woburn Sands) was largely rural farmland but included many picturesque North Buckinghamshire villages and hamlets: Bradwell village and its Abbey, Broughton, Caldecotte, Great Linford, Loughton, Milton Keynes Village, New Bradwell, Shenley Brook End, Shenley Church End, Simpson, Stantonbury, Tattenhoe, Tongwell, Walton, Water Eaton, Wavendon, Willen, Great and Little Woolstone, Woughton on the Green. These historical settlements were made the focal points of their respective grid square. Every other district has an historical antecedent, if only in original farms or even field names.

Bletchley was first recorded in the 12th century as Blechelai. Its station was an important junction (the London and North Western Railway with the Oxford-Cambridge Varsity Line), leading to the substantial urban growth in the town in the Victorian period. It expanded to absorb the village of Water Eaton and town of Fenny Stratford.

Bradwell  is a traditional rural village with earthworks of a Norman motte and bailey and parish church. There is a YHA hostel beside the church.

Bradwell Abbey, a former Benedictine Priory and scheduled monument, was of major economic importance in this area of North Buckinghamshire before its dissolution in 1524. Nowadays there is only a small medieval chapel and a manor house occupying the site.

New Bradwell, to the north of Bradwell and east of Wolverton, was built specifically for railway workers. The level bed of the old Wolverton to Newport Pagnell Line near here has been converted to a redway, making it a favoured route for cycling. A working windmill is sited on a hill outside the village.

Great Linford appears in the Domesday Book as Linforde, and features a church dedicated to Saint Andrew, dating from 1215. Today, the outer buildings of the 17th century manor house form an arts centre.

Milton Keynes (Village) is the original village to which the New Town owes its name. The original village is still evident, with a pleasant thatched pub, village hall, church and traditional housing. The area around the village has reverted to its 11th century name of Middleton (Middeltone). The oldest surviving domestic building in the area (c. 1300 CE), "perhaps the manor house", is here.

Stony Stratford began as a settlement on Watling Street during the Roman occupation, beside the ford over the Great Ouse. There has been a market here since 1194 (by charter of King Richard I). The former Rose and Crown Inn on the High Street is reputedly the last place the Princes in the Tower were seen alive.

The manor house of Walton village, Walton Hall, is the headquarters of the Open University and the tiny parish church (deconsecrated) is in its grounds.

The small parish church (1680) at Willen was designed by the architect and physicist Robert Hooke. Nearby, there is a Buddhist Temple and a Peace Pagoda, which was built in 1980 and was the first built by the Nipponzan-Myōhōji Buddhist Order in the western world.

The original Wolverton was a medieval settlement just north and west of today's town. The ridge and furrow pattern of agriculture can still be seen in the nearby fields.  The 12th century (rebuilt in 1819) 'Church of the Holy Trinity' still stands next to the Norman motte and bailey site. Modern Wolverton was a 19th-century New Town built to house the workers at the Wolverton railway works, which built engines and carriages for the London and North Western Railway.

Among the smaller villages and hamlets are three Broughton, Loughton and Woughton on the Green that are of note in that their names each use a different pronunciation of the ough letter sequence in English.

Education

Schools
In early planning, education provision was carefully integrated into the development plans with the intention that school journeys would, as far as possible, be made by walking and cycling. Each residential grid square was provided with a primary school (ages 5 to 8) for c.240 children, and for each two squares there was a middle school (ages 8 to 12) for c.480 children. For each eight squares there was a large secondary education campus, to contain between two and four schools for a total of 3,000 – 4,500 children. A central resource area served all the schools on a campus. In addition, each campus included a leisure centre with indoor and outdoor sports facilities and a swimming pool, plus a theatre. These facilities were available to the public outside school hours, thus maximising use of the investment. Changes in central government policy from the 1980s onwards subsequently led to much of this system being abandoned. Some schools have since been merged and sites sold for development, many converted to academies, and the leisure centres outsourced to commercial providers.

As in most parts of the UK, the state secondary schools in Milton Keynes are comprehensives, although schools in the rest of Buckinghamshire still use the tripartite system. Private schools are also available.

Universities and colleges

           
The Open University's headquarters are in the Walton Hall district; though because this is a distance learning institution, the only students resident on campus are approximately 200 full-time postgraduates. Cranfield University, an all-postgraduate institution, is in nearby Cranfield, Bedfordshire. Milton Keynes College provides further education up to foundation degree level. A campus of the University of Bedfordshire provides some tertiary education facilities locally. , Milton Keynes is the UK's largest population centre without its own conventional university, a shortfall that the Council aims to rectify. In January 2019, the Council and its partner, Cranfield University, invited proposals to design a campus near the Central station for a new university, code-named MK:U. (the project is stalled following a government decision to deny funding.) Through Milton Keynes University Hospital, the city also has links with the University of Buckingham's medical school.

City development archive and library
Milton Keynes City Discovery Centre at Bradwell Abbey  holds an extensive archive about the planning and development of Milton Keynes and has an associated research library. The Centre also offers an education programme (with a focus on urban geography and local history) to schools, universities and professionals.

Culture, media and sport

Music

The open-air National Bowl is a 65,000-capacity venue for large-scale events.

In Wavendon, the Stables founded by the jazz musicians Cleo Laine and John Dankworth provides a venue for jazz, blues, folk, rock, classical, pop and world music.  It presents around 400 concerts and over 200 educational events each year and also hosts the National Youth Music Camps summer camp for young musicians. In 2010, the Stables founded the biennial IF Milton Keynes International Festival, producing events in unconventional spaces and places across Milton Keynes.

Milton Keynes City Orchestra is a professional freelance orchestra based at Woughton Campus.

Arts, cinema, theatre and museums
The municipal public art gallery, MK Gallery, presents free exhibitions of international contemporary art. The gallery was extended and remodelled in 2018/19 and includes an art-house cinema. There are also two multiplex cinemas; one in CMK and one in Denbigh.

In 1999, the adjacent 1,400-seat Milton Keynes Theatre opened. The theatre has an unusual feature: the ceiling can be lowered closing off the third tier (gallery) to create a more intimate space for smaller-scale productions. There is a further professional performance space in Stantonbury.

There are three museums: the Bletchley Park complex, which houses the museum of wartime cryptography; the National Museum of Computing (adjacent to Bletchley Park,  with a separate entrance), which includes a working replica of the Colossus computer; and the Milton Keynes Museum, which includes the Stacey Hill Collection of rural life that existed before the foundation of MK, the British Telecom collection, and the original Concrete Cows. 
Other numerous public sculptures in Milton Keynes include work by Elisabeth Frink, Philip Jackson, Nicolas Moreton and Ronald Rae.

Milton Keynes Arts Centre offers a year-round exhibition programme, family workshops and courses. The centre is based in some of Linford Manor's historical exterior buildings, barns, almshouses and pavilions. The Westbury Arts Centre in Shenley Wood is based in a 16th-century grade II listed farmhouse building. Westbury Arts has been providing spaces and studios for professional artists since 1994.

Communications and media
For television, the area is allocated  to BBC East and ITV Anglia.  For radio, Milton Keynes is served by Heart East (a regional commercial station based locally)  and two community radio stations (MKFM and Secklow 105.5). BBC Three Counties Radio is the local BBC Radio station. CRMK (Cable Radio Milton Keynes)  is a voluntary station broadcasting on the Internet.

, Milton Keynes has one local newspaper, the Milton Keynes Citizen, which has a significant online presence.

Sport

Milton Keynes has professional teams in football (Milton Keynes Dons F.C. at Stadium MK), in ice hockey (Milton Keynes Lightning at Planet Ice Milton Keynes), and in Formula One (Red Bull Racing).

The Xscape indoor ski slope and the iFLY indoor sky diving facility are important attractions in CMK; the National Badminton Centre in Loughton is home to the national badminton squad and headquarters of Badminton England.

Many other sports are represented at amateur level.

Near the central station, in a space beside the former Milton Keynes central bus station, there is a purpose-built street skateboarding plaza named the Buszy.

Willen Lake hosts watersports on the south basin.

Government

Local government
The responsible local government is Milton Keynes City Council, which controls the City of Milton Keynes, a unitary authority, and non-metropolitan county in law, since May 1996. Until then, it was controlled by Buckinghamshire County Council. Historically, most of the area that became Milton Keynes was known as the "Three Hundreds of Newport".

The unitary authority area is fully parished.

International co-operation
Although Milton Keynes has no formalised twinning agreements, it has partnered and co-operated with various cities over the years. The most contact has been with Almere, Netherlands, especially on energy management and urban planning. For several years from 1995, the city co-operated with Tychy, Poland, after participating in the European City Cooperation System in Tychy in March 1994.

Due to the twinning of the borough and the equivalent administrative region of Bernkastel-Wittlich, the council worked with Bernkastel-Kues, Germany, for example on art projects.

In 2017 they partnered with the Chinese fellow smart city of Yinchuan.

Infrastructure

Hospitals
Milton Keynes University Hospital, in the Eaglestone district, is an NHS general hospital with an Accident and Emergency unit.
It is associated for medical teaching purposes with the University of Buckingham medical school. There are two small private hospitals: BMI Healthcare's Saxon Clinic and Ramsay Health Care's Blakelands Hospital.

Prison
There is a Category A male prison, HMP Woodhill, on the western boundary. A section of the prison is a Young Offenders Institution.

Transport

The Grand Union Canal, the West Coast Main Line, the A5 road and the M1 motorway provide the major axes that influenced the urban designers.

The urban area is served by seven railway stations. ,  and  stations are on the West Coast Main Line and are served by local commuter services between London and Birmingham or Crewe. Milton Keynes Central is also served by inter-city services between London and Scotland, Wales and the North West and the West Midlands of England: express services to London take 35 minutes.

The M1 motorway runs along the east flank of MK and serves it from junctions 13 and 14 within the environs of the MK urban area, and junctions 11a and 15 slightly further away via other connecting roads. The A5 road runs right through as a grade separated dual carriageway. Other main roads are the A509 to Wellingborough and Kettering, and the A421 and A422, both running west towards Buckingham and east towards Bedford. Additionally, the A4146 runs from (near) junction 14 of the M1 to Leighton Buzzard. Proximity to the M1 has led to construction of a number of distribution centres, including Magna Park at the south-eastern flank of Milton Keynes, near Wavendon.

There is also a park and ride car park on the site. Regional coaches stop at Milton Keynes Central.

Milton Keynes is served by (and, via its Redway network, provides part of) routes 6 and 51 on the National Cycle Network.

The nearest international airport is London Luton and is easily reached by coach.

Demographics

At the 2011 census, the population of the Milton Keynes urban area, including the adjacent Newport Pagnell and Woburn Sands, was 229,941. The population of the borough in total was 248,800, compared with a population of around 53,000 for the same area in 1961. In 2016, the Office for National Statistics estimated that the Borough population will reach 300,000 by 2025. Provisional data for the 2021 census records the population of the Milton Keynes Built-up Area as 256,385, and that of the Borough (now City) as approximately 287,000.

According to the 2011 census, the average age of the population is lower than is typical for the UK's 63 primary urban areas: 25.3% of the borough population were aged under 18 (5th place) and 13.4% were aged 65+ (57th out of 63). The "mean age is 35.7 and the median age is 35. 18.5% of residents were born outside the UK (11th). At the 2011 census, the ethnic profile was 78.9% white, 3.4% mixed, 9.7% Asian/Asian British, 7.3% Black/African/Caribbean/Black British, and 0.7% other. The religious profile was that 62.0% of people were reported having a religion and 31.4% having none; the remainder declined to say: 52% are Christian, 5.1% Muslim, 3.0% Hindu; other religions each had less than 1% of the population.

Economy, finances and business

In 2014 and 2017, Milton Keynes ranked third in terms of contribution to the national economy, as measured by gross value added per worker, of the 63 largest conurbations in the UK. In 2020, its ranking slipped to seventh.

Major businesses
Milton Keynes has consistently benefited from above-average economic growth, ranked as one of the UK's top five cities. In 2020 it was ranked sixth of 63 for business startups (per 10,000 people).

Milton Keynes is home to several national and international companies, notably 
Argos, 
Domino's Pizza,
Marshall Amplification,
Mercedes-Benz, 
Suzuki, 
Volkswagen Group, 
Red Bull Racing, 
Network Rail, and Yamaha Music Europe.

Santander UK and the Open University are major employers locally.

Small and medium enterprise
In 2013, 99.4% of enterprises being SMEs, just 0.6% of businesses locally employ more than 250 people (but more than one third of employees), whereas 81.5% employ fewer than 10 people. The 'professional, scientific and technical sector' contributes the largest number of business units, 16.7%. The retail sector is the largest contributor of employment. Milton Keynes has one of the highest number of business start-ups in England, but also of failures. Although education, health and public administration are important contributors to employment, the contribution is significantly less than the averages for England or the South East.

Employment
75% of the population is economically active, including 8.3% (of the population) who are self-employed. 90% work in service industries of various sorts (of which wholesale and retail is the largest sector) and 9% in manufacturing.

Social inequality
In 2015, the City of Milton Keynes had nine 'lower super output areas' that are in the 10% most deprived in England, but also had twelve 'lower super output areas' in the 10% least deprived in England. This contrast between areas of affluence and areas of deprivation in spite of a thriving local economy, inspired local charity The Community Foundation (in its 2016 'Vital Signs' report) to describe the position as a 'Tale of Two Cities'.

In 2018, the number of homeless young people sleeping rough in tents around CMK attracted national headlines as it became the apex of a national problem of poverty, inadequate mental health care and unaffordable housing. On a visit to refurbishment and extension work on the YMCA building, Housing Minister Heather Wheeler declared that 'Nobody in this day and age should be sleeping on the street'.

Geography

Location and nearest settlements

The nearest larger towns are Northampton, Bedford, Luton and Aylesbury. The nearest larger cities are Coventry, Leicester, Cambridge, London and Oxford.

Geology
Its surface geology is primarily gently rolling Oxford clay or, more formally:

Its highest points are in the centre and at Woodhill on the western boundary. The lowest point of the urban area is in Newport Pagnell, where the Ouzel joins the Great Ouse.

Parks and environmental infrastructure
Because of the (poorly drained) clay soils and the urban hard surfaces, the development corporation identified water runoff into the Ouzel and its tributaries as a significant risk to be managed and so put in place two large balancing lakes (Caldecotte and Willen) and a number of smaller detention ponds. These provide an important leisure amenity for most of the year. Building in the floodplains of the Ouse and Ouzel was precluded too, thus providing long-distance linear parks that are within easy reach of most residents.
 
The north basin of Willen Lake is a bird sanctuary.

The two Sites of Special Scientific Interest, Howe Park Wood and Oxley Mead, are the most significant of a number of important wildlife sites in and around MK.

Just outside the Milton Keynes urban area lies Little Linford Wood, a conservation site and nature reserve managed by the Berkshire, Buckinghamshire and Oxfordshire Wildlife Trust. It is considered to be one of the best habitats for dormice.

Climate
Milton Keynes experiences an oceanic climate (Köppen climate classification Cfb) as is typical of almost all of the United Kingdom.

The nearest Met Office weather station is in Woburn, Bedfordshire, just outside the south eastern fringe of Milton Keynes. In 2010, the temperature fell to

Notable people

Sports

 Charles Ademeno, former professional footballer
 Dele Alli, professional footballer
 Andrew Baggaley, English table tennis champion
 Brothers George and Sam Baldock, professional footballers.
 Ben Chilwell, professional footballer
 Chris Clarke, English sprinter
 Lee Hasdell, professional Mixed martial artist and Kickboxer
 James Hildreth, professional cricketer
 Liam Kelly, professional footballer
 Kwame Nkrumah-Acheampong the only Ghanaian winter Olympian.
 Craig Pickering, English sprinter
 Ian Poulter, PGA & European Tour golf professional. Member of the 2010 and 2012 European Ryder Cup Teams
 Mark Randall, professional footballer
 Antonee Robinson, professional footballer
 Greg Rutherford, long jump gold medallist for Team GB at the 2012 Olympic Games
 Ed Slater, professional rugby union player
Fallon Sherrock, professional darts player. 
 Sam Tomkins, professional rugby league player
 Dan Wheldon (1978–2011), Indy car driver
 Leah Williamson, professional footballer

Business
 Jim Marshall (1923–2012), founder and CEO of Marshall Amplification was living in and ran his business from Milton Keynes when he died
 Pete Winkelman, Chairman of Milton Keynes Dons Football Club, owner of Linford Manor recording studios, long-term resident

Academic
 Christopher B-Lynch, (visiting) Professor of Obstetrics and Gynaecology at Cranfield University, responsible for inventing the eponymously named B-Lynch suture
 Alan P. F. Sell (1935–2016), academic and theologian lived in Milton Keynes in his later years and died there
 Alan Turing (1912–1954), played a significant role in the creation of the modern computer. He lodged at the Crown Inn, Shenley Brook End, while working at Bletchley Park

Stage, screen and media
 Errol Barnett, an anchor and correspondent for CNN
Emily Bergl, an actress known for her roles in Desperate Housewives and Shameless
 Richard Macer, documentary maker
 Clare Nasir, the meteorologist, TV and radio personality, was born in Milton Keynes in 1970
Kevin Whately, professional actor

Literature

 Sarah Pinborough, English horror writer
 Jack Trevor Story, novelist, was a long-term resident of Milton Keynes

Politics
 Frank Markham (Sir Sydney Frank Markham, MP) (18971975), born in Stony Stratford and was local MP (19511964).
 Nat Wei, Baron Wei, member of the House of Lords (born Watford, grew up in Milton Keynes)

Music

Individual
 Adam Ficek, drummer of London band Babyshambles
 Gordon Moakes, the bassist for the London-based rock band Bloc Party

Bands

 Capdown, a ska punk band, came from and formed in Milton Keynes in 1997
 Fellsilent, a metal band, come from and formed in Milton Keynes in 2003
 Tesseract, a djent band, formed as a full live act in Milton Keynes in 2007. Tesseract's guitarist, songwriter and producer Acle Kahney is also a former member of Fellsilent.
 Hacktivist, a Grime and djent band
 RavenEye, the rock band, formed in Milton Keynes in 2014

Freedom of the City

Notes

References

Citations

Sources

External links 

 Official visitor website for Milton Keynes (Milton Keynes Council agency)
 City Discovery Centre (MK urban studies centre)
 Urban Design magazine "Milton Keynes at 40"
 Milton Keynes in 1968, on BFI Player
  
 , ~5800 words. (Note that the opening paragraph about astronomical alignment is not true.)

 
Populated places on the River Great Ouse
Cities in South East England
New towns in England
Populated places established in 1967
1967 establishments in England
New towns started in the 1960s
Towns in Buckinghamshire